Yugoslav basketball clubs in European and worldwide competitions is the performance record of men's professional basketball clubs from the former Socialist Federal Republic of Yugoslavia's top-tier level, First Federal Basketball League, that played in international competitions.

The finals

EuroLeague (1st-tier), since 1958 to 2005–06 season

Season to season

✝Partizan was drawn for the competition but was not allowed to compete due to UN embargo on FR Yugoslavia. FIBA decided not to replace Partizan with another team for the Regular Season Group Stage, so the 15 qualified clubs had to be unevenly distributed in this round (a group of 8 teams and another of only 7).
✝✝Crvena zvezda was drawn for the competition but was not allowed to compete due to UN embargo on FR Yugoslavia. So PAOK went through with a walkover.

FIBA Saporta Cup (2nd-tier), since 1966–67 to 2001–02 season

Season to season

✝Spartak Subotica was drawn for the competition but was not allowed to compete due to UN embargo on FR Yugoslavia. So Dinamo București went through with a walkover.

EuroCup (2nd-tier), since 2002–03 to 2005–06 season

Season to season

FIBA Korać Cup (3rd-tier), since 1972 to 2001–02 season

Season to season

✝Sloboda Užice, Radnički Belgrade and Budućnost were drawn for the competition but were not allowed to compete due to UN embargo on FR Yugoslavia. So MOL Szolnoki Olajbányász, Stroitel Kharkov and Sunair Oostende went through with a walkover.

See also
European basketball clubs in European and worldwide competitions from:
 Croatia
 Czechoslovakia
 France
 Greece
 Israel
 Italy
 Russia
 Spain
 Turkey
 USSR